Janet M. Wilson  is a UK-based New Zealand academic who specialises in post colonial New Zealand literature.

Academic career
Janet Mary Wilson is Emerita Professor of English and Postcolonial Studies, Faculty of Arts, Science and Humanities, University of Northampton  and editor of the Journal of Postcolonial Writing and on the board of the Journal of New Zealand Literature.

Previous appointments were held at Birkbeck, University of London, University of Otago, Oxford Brookes University, University of Oxford, Trinity College Dublin, University of Auckland and University of Sydney.

Wilson was elected Vice President of the National Conference of University Professors in 2018 and became President in 2020 until 2022.

Education
Wilson holds an MA in English from the Victoria University of Wellington, an MA in Medieval English from the University of Sydney and a DPhil from St Catherine’s College, Oxford.

Professional life
Wilson currently holds a Visiting Professorship at Birmingham City University, is an Academic Visitor at University of Auckland and a Visiting Research Fellow at Rothermere American Institute University of Oxford where she was previously a Senior Research Fellow and an Associate Research Fellow. She was previously a Visiting Fellow at Jamia Millia Islamia University.

Awards and recognition
Wilson was a recipient of an Australian Commonwealth Fellowship at the University of Sydney (1972-1974) and a Violet Vaughan Morgan Studentship at St Catherine’s College, Oxford (1980-1981).

Personal life
Wilson is married to the New Zealand writer and poet Kevin Ireland.

Bibliography
Gasston A, Kimber G, Wilson J (Eds.) (2020) Katherine Mansfield: New Directions Bloomsbury, London 
Wilson J (Ed.) (2020) The General and the Nightingale: Dan Davin's War Stories Otago University Press, Dunedin 
Stierstorfer K, Wilson J (Eds.) (2017) The Routledge Diaspora Studies Reader Routledge, London 
Tunca D, Wilson J (Eds.) (2016) Postcolonial Gateways and Walls: Under Construction Brill, Leiden 
Ringrose C, Wilson J (Eds.) (2016) New Soundings in Postcolonial Writing: Critical and Creative  Contours Brill- Rodopi, Leiden & Boston 
 Fresno Calleja P (Translator), Wilson J (Eds.) (2014) Un país de cuento. Veinte relatos de Nueva Zelanda Prensas de la Universidad de Zaragoza, Zaragoza 
Kimber G, da Sousa Correa D, Wilson J (Eds.) (2013) Katherine Mansfield and the (Post)colonial Edinburgh University Press, Edinburgh 
Wilson J, Kimber G, Reid S (Eds.) (2011) Katherine Mansfield and Literary Modernism. London: Continuum Bloomsbury, London 
Kimber G, Wilson J (Eds.) (2011) Celebrating Katherine Mansfield: A Centenary Volume of Essays Palgrave, London 
Wilson J, Sandru C, Lawson Welsh S (Eds.) (2010) Rerouting the Postcolonial: New Directions for the New Millennium Routledge. London 
Wilson J (2008) Fleur Adcock Northcote House and the British Council, Plymouth 
Wilson J (Ed.) (2007) The Gorse Blooms Pale: The Southland Stories of Dan Davin Otago University Press, Dunedin

References

External links
 linked-in
 institutional homepage

Living people
Academics of the University of Oxford
1948 births
University of Sydney alumni
Victoria University of Wellington alumni
Alumni of St Catherine's College, Oxford
Academic staff of the University of Otago
Academics of the University of Northampton
Academics of Birkbeck, University of London